Gordon Crosby (21 March 1927 – 3 January 2019) was a Canadian sprinter. He competed in the men's 4 × 100 metres relay at the 1952 Summer Olympics.

References

External links
 

1927 births
2019 deaths
Athletes (track and field) at the 1952 Summer Olympics
Canadian male sprinters
Canadian male hurdlers
Olympic track and field athletes of Canada
Athletes (track and field) at the 1950 British Empire Games
Commonwealth Games competitors for Canada
Athletes from Toronto